Michael Gibson, GC (21 June 1906 – 18 October 1940) was a British Army soldier who was posthumously awarded the George Cross for the conspicuous gallantry he displayed in Coventry on 14 September 1940 in defusing a large unexploded bomb.

Prior to joining the Royal Engineers at the outset of the Second World War, Gibson was a miner in Chopwell, County Durham, and had served 14 years within the Territorial Army attached to the Durham Light Infantry.

George Cross
Following a Luftwaffe bombing raid on the night of the 13/14 September 1940, two unexploded bombs were detected in a factory complex near Coventry. The area was evacuated and members of the 9th Bomb Disposal Company, Royal Engineers, including Gibson, were called in to defuse them.

The first detonated but no-one was hurt. Gibson and his men uncovered the second bomb beneath rubble but found the bomb to be hissing. Gibson sent his men away to safety and proceeded to defuse the bomb.

The posthumous award of the George Cross to Michael Gibson appeared in The London Gazette on 21 January 1941:

Death
On 18 October 1940, Gibson was one of seven bomb disposal men that had recovered a  bomb from a Coventry housing estate. The still active bomb was transported via lorry to be defused at Whitley Common. The bomb exploded during unloading from the lorry, killing all of the men.

Following a funeral service at Coventry Cathedral on 25 October 1940, the squad were buried in a collective grave in Coventry's London Road Cemetery. The squad comprised Second Lieutenant Alexander Fraser Campbell and Sappers William Gibson, Richard Gilchrest, Jack Plumb, Ronald William Skelton, Ernest Arthur Stote and Gibson. Gibson was 34 when he was killed.

Memorial
On 18 October 2008, the anniversary of the death of Gibson and his fellow soldiers, a memorial plaque was dedicated to their memory close to where they died on Whitley Common.

The memorial reads:

Gibson's George Cross, Defence Medal and War Medal 1939-45 were sold at auction for £93,000 on 18 December 2012.

Family
Michael Gibson married Elizabeth Hardy; they had two sons, Derek and John.

References

1906 births
1940 deaths
British recipients of the George Cross
Royal Engineers soldiers
Durham Light Infantry soldiers
Deaths by airstrike during World War II
British Army personnel killed in World War II
Bomb disposal personnel
Military personnel from County Durham